Elizabeth Arrieta (10 September 1960 – 30 November 2019) was an Uruguayan engineer and politician who served as a Deputy from 2015 until her death.

References

1960 births
2019 deaths
Members of the Chamber of Representatives of Uruguay
21st-century Uruguayan women politicians
21st-century Uruguayan politicians
Uruguayan engineers
20th-century women engineers
Road incident deaths in Uruguay